Onpu or ONPU may refer to:

 Odessa National Polytechnic University, a university in Odessa, Ukraine 
 Japanese term for the phonetic component of a kanji character (Chinese character)
 Japanese for musical note, often used for characters such as ♪ (see List of Japanese typographic symbols#Other special marks)
 Onpu Segawa, a character in Ojamajo Doremi